Gmina Wągrowiec is a rural gmina (administrative district) in Wągrowiec County, Greater Poland Voivodeship, in west-central Poland. Its seat is the town of Wągrowiec, although the town is not part of the territory of the gmina.

Villages
Gmina Wągrowiec contains the villages and settlements of Bartodzieje, Bobrowniki, Bracholin, Brzeźno Stare, Bukowiec, Czekanowo, Dąbkowice, Danabórz, Dębina, Długa Wieś, Grylewo, Jakubowo, Jankowo, Józefowo, Kaliska, Kaliszany, Kamienica, Kiedrowo, Kobylec, Kołybiec, Koninek, Kopaszyn, Koźlanka, Krosno, Kurki, Łaziska, Łęgowo, Łekno, Ludwikowo, Łukowo, Micharzewo, Mikołajewo, Nowa Wieś, Nowe, Ochodza, Oporzyn, Orla, Ostrowo-Młyn, Pawłowo Żońskie, Pokrzywnica, Potulice, Potuły, Przysieczyn, Przysieka, Rąbczyn, Redgoszcz, Rgielsko, Rudnicze, Rudniczyn, Runówko, Runowo, Runowskie, Sady, Sarbka, Siedleczko, Sienno, Sieńsko, Tarnowo Pałuckie, Toniszewo, Werkowo, Wiatrowiec, Wiatrowo, Wiśniewo, Żelazka and Żelice.

Neighbouring gminas
Gmina Wągrowiec is bordered by the town of Wągrowiec and by the gminas of Budzyń, Damasławek, Gołańcz, Margonin, Mieścisko, Rogoźno and Skoki.

References
Polish official population figures 2006

Wagrowiec
Wągrowiec County